My Blind Date With Life is a 2017 German biographical film directed by Marc Rothemund.

Cast 
 Kostja Ullmann - Saliya Kahawatte
 Anna Maria Mühe - Laura
 Ludger Pistor - Lehrer Döngen
 Nilam Farooq - Sheela
  - Herr Kolditz
  - Hamid
  - Kleinschmidt
 Jacob Matschenz - Max
  - Augenarzt
 Olivia Marei - Tina
 Alexander Held - Fried
  - Deutschlehrer
  - Küchenchef Krohn
  - Jala Asgari

References

External links 

2017 films
2010s biographical films
2017 comedy-drama films
German biographical films
German comedy-drama films
Films about blind people
Films set in hotels
2017 comedy films
Films directed by Marc Rothemund
2010s German films
2010s German-language films